Salomon van Abbé (born Amsterdam, 31 July 1883, died London, 28 February 1955), also known as Jack van Abbé or Jack Abbey, was an artist, etcher and illustrator of books and magazines.

Early years
Abbé was born in the Netherlands but moved with his family to England when he was five years old and became a naturalised citizen. He added the accent to his name, becoming van Abbé. He studied at local state schools, the People's Palace, Toynbee Hall, Central School of Art and at the London County Council School of Photo-engraving and Lithography at Bolt Court, where he met Edmund Blampied, Robert Charles Peter and John Nicolson – all fellow etchers.

Memberships
In 1923, Abbé was elected an Associate of the Royal Society of Painter-Etchers and was a member of the Royal Society of British Artists (RBA), as well as President of the London Sketch Club and a member of the Art Workers Guild.

He was awarded a bronze medal at the Paris Salon in 1939.

Work
Salomon van Abbé was noted for his drypoints of the legal profession and the law. He signed much of his commercial work as an illustrator "Abbey", or "S. Abbey" to distinguish himself from his brother, Joseph van Abbé (1889–1954), who signed himself "J. Abbey". (In the 1911 census, the van Abbé family gave their surname as Abbey.) He also used the pseudonym "C. Morse" because of problems with publishers.

Much of Abbé's commercial work was to design the dust jackets for books from for publishers such as Ward Lock & Co, Collins, Thomas Nelson, Thornton Butterworth, Methuen, John Murray, Skeffingtons, Hamish Hamilton, Nash and Grayson and Herbert Jenkins. Because his work for publishers was so prolific, he designed the jackets of many notable books published in the 1920s and 1930s, including the first "Saint" book by Leslie Charteris (Meet the Tiger, Ward Lock, 1928), The Mystery of the Blue Train by Agatha Christie (William Collins, Sons, 1928) and the first two novels by Dorothy L. Sayers (T. Fisher Unwin). In the 1950s he illustrated several children's books for Dent, including Treasure Island, Tanglewood Tales, Little Women and Good Wives. Other notable works he illustrated were John Galsworthy's Loyalties for Duckworth in 1930, William Kent's My Lord Mayor and the City of London (Herbert Jenkins, 1947), and Carola Oman's Robin Hood (Dent, 1949). He also painted the front covers for the Christmas Number of the Radio Times in 1924 and 1925.

Van Abbé has paintings in national collections in the United Kingdom.

Family
Salomon van Abbé married Hannah Wolff (1891–1973) on 3 August 1914 in Stoke Newington, now part of London. They had two sons, Derek Maurice (1917–1982) and Norman (1921–2003). His sister Marianne (1887–1986) married the Jersey artist Edmund Blampied.

References

External links
Salomon van Abbé at Art UK

1883 births
1955 deaths
British illustrators
20th-century British printmakers
English etchers
Dutch etchers
Alumni of the Central School of Art and Design
Artists from Amsterdam
Dutch emigrants to the United Kingdom